Koffi Dan Kowa (born 19 September 1989) is a Nigerien footballer who spent the most of his career as a centre back for Sahel SC.

Club career
Kowa was born in Accra, Ghana. He started his senior career with Nigerien side Sahel SC, before spending three seasons with Espérance Sportive de Zarzis in Tunisia.

In August 2013, Kowa signed a three-year contract with Bidvest Wits who play in the South African Premier Soccer League.

International career
Kowa is a member of Niger national team. He represented the team in the 2012 African Cup of Nations.

International goals
Scores and results list Niger's goal tally first.

References

External links
FIFA profile

1989 births
Living people
Footballers from Accra
Association football central defenders
Nigerien footballers
Ghanaian emigrants to Niger
Niger international footballers
2012 Africa Cup of Nations players
2013 Africa Cup of Nations players
Sahel SC players
ES Zarzis players
Sporting Clube de Goa players
Beitar Tel Aviv Bat Yam F.C. players
FC Dila Gori players
Hapoel Nof HaGalil F.C. players
Tunisian Ligue Professionnelle 1 players
South African Premier Division players
Liga Leumit players
Erovnuli Liga players
Nigerien expatriate footballers
Expatriate footballers in Tunisia
Expatriate soccer players in South Africa
Expatriate footballers in India
Expatriate footballers in Israel
Expatriate footballers in Georgia (country)
Nigerien expatriate sportspeople in Tunisia
Nigerien expatriate sportspeople in South Africa
Nigerien expatriate sportspeople in India
Nigerien expatriate sportspeople in Israel
Nigerien expatriate sportspeople in Georgia (country)
2016 African Nations Championship players
Niger A' international footballers